

Season 
Inter purchased Karl-Heinz Rummenigge, a striker well known for his physical skills and the regularity in scoring. The other foreign was Liam Brady, former Juventus player. The German – who declared to have chosen the Italian league it was the most difficult step of his career – partnered with Alessandro Altobelli, resulting in a notable number of goals. Before the Christmas break, Inter had reached the quarter-finals of the UEFA Cup and was second in Serie A behind an underdog opponent, Hellas Verona.

However, when the path became to get harder, the side did not manage to meet the expectations. In the semi-finals of European cup, they went out to Real Madrid despite a 2–0 win in the first leg: the Spanish team was able – in the second leg – to reach a 3–0 success, leaving Inter to complain for a glass bead that hit Bergomi on head. The season ended in a third place outcome, behind Hellas Verona and Torino. Inter had a gap of five points from first place.

Squad

Goalkeepers
  Walter Zenga
  Angelo Recchi

Defenders
  Giuseppe Bergomi
  Giuseppe Baresi
  Riccardo Ferri
  Fulvio Collovati
  Graziano Bini
  Andrea Mandorlini
  Luca Meazza

Midfielders
  Enrico Cucchi
  Giampiero Marini
  Franco Causio
  Giancarlo Pasinato
  Liam Brady
  Luigi Rocca
  Antonio Sabato

Attackers
  Alessandro Altobelli
  Karl-Heinz Rummenigge
  Carlo Muraro
  Massimo Pellegrini
  Amerigo Paradiso

Competitions

Serie A

League table

Matches

Appearances and goals 
Statistics referred to domestic league.

Altobelli (30/17); Baresi G. (30/1); Bergomi (29/2); Brady (29/2); Collovati (29/2); Mandorlini (29); Sabato (29/1); Ferri (28/1); Rummenigge (26/8); Zenga (25/−23); Causio (24); Marini (23/3); Pasinato (12); Cucchi (7); Muraro (7/1); Recchi (5/−5); Bini (4).

Coppa Italia

Group 2

Eightfinals

Quarterfinals

Semifinals

UEFA Cup 

First Round

Second round

Eightfinals

Quarterfinals

Semifinals

References

Sources
   RSSSF - Italy 1984/85

Inter Milan seasons
Inter